Aaron Gelman  (November 24, 1899 – May 1970) was an American artist. He worked on oils, pastels, etchings, drawings and sculptures. Gelman was born to Jewish immigrant parents from Petah Tikva, The Ottoman Palestine (present-day Israel). He died in Israel, where he had returned later in life.

Life 
He studied at the Hartford Academy of Art, the Art Students’ League and the National Academy of Design. Gelman was a member of the New York School of Painting, of which George Luks was the best known member. This school followed the Hudson School of Painting. He was also a WPA artist. His painting "Across the Gowanus Canal" is in the collection of the Pennsylvania Academy of the Fine Arts.

Family 
He was a brother-in-law to Philip Solomon, uncle to Linda Solomon, and one of his grandchildren is the actress Kimiko Gelman. His grandfather, Avraham Yaakov Gelman was one of the 11 founding families of Mazkeret Batya (Ekron). These emigrant families came from Ruzhany, with support from the Baron de Rothschild, to settle Moshav Ekron. He was a close friend of fellow artist Harris "Harry" Rodvogin.

References

1889 births
1970 deaths
20th-century American painters
American emigrants to Israel
American male painters
American people of Belarusian-Jewish descent
American people of Israeli descent
Federal Art Project artists
Jewish American artists
Jewish Israeli artists
Jews in Mandatory Palestine
20th-century American male artists